Afak is a town in Al-Qadisiyah Governorate, Iraq. It is located 25 km (16 mi) northeast of Al Diwaniyah and 170 km (105 mi) south of Baghdad.

It is speculated that the lost city of Irisaĝrig is located near Afak.

References

Populated places in Al-Qādisiyyah Governorate